Peter Breakwell (born 25 October 1957) is a New Zealand former equestrian. He competed in the individual jumping event at the 2000 Summer Olympics.

References

External links
 

1957 births
Living people
New Zealand male equestrians
Olympic equestrians of New Zealand
Equestrians at the 2000 Summer Olympics
People from Waipukurau
20th-century New Zealand people
21st-century New Zealand people
Sportspeople from the Hawke's Bay Region